Larry Brantley (born October 30, 1966) is an American voice actor and a former stand-up comedian and radio spokesman, best known as the voice of Wishbone, a Jack Russell Terrier who was featured in a PBS children's television series. Brantley, who went to Conroe High School, specializes in character voices. He was also a voice actor on the animated project for children called Boz the Bear, and voiced Corporal Franklin Paddock in Brothers in Arms: Earned in Blood. He was also a volleyball coach in McKinney, Texas for a team called "The Straight Aces" and "Orange Crush". He currently stands as a cast member at Medieval Times Dinner and Tournament in Dallas.

Filmography

Anime

Film

Television

Video games

References

External links

 
Boz the Bear

1966 births
Living people
American stand-up comedians
21st-century American male actors
American male voice actors
American male comedians
American male film actors
American male television actors
21st-century American comedians
20th-century American comedians
20th-century American male actors
Male actors from Houston
Comedians from Texas
Conroe High School alumni